AltaLink, L.P. is one of Canada's largest electricity transmission companies.  Based in Alberta, AltaLink is responsible for the maintenance and operation of approximately 12,000 kilometres of transmission lines and 280 substations in Alberta. AltaLink is owned by Berkshire Hathaway Energy.

Overview
AltaLink, L.P. is an Alberta-based utility company that provides electricity transmission services to most of Alberta. On April 30, 2002, AltaLink assumed control of Alberta's largest transmission system previously owned by TransAlta. It owns and operates approximately 12,000 km of transmission lines and approximately 280 substations, which makes up for the bulk of Alberta's high‐voltage electricity transmission infrastructure. AltaLink also owns and operates the Alberta portion of the interconnection that allows electricity to be exchanged between Alberta and British Columbia.

AltaLink has more than 600 employees. Headquartered in Calgary, Alberta, the company also has offices in Lethbridge, Red Deer, and Edmonton.

On May 1, 2014, AltaLink announced that Berkshire Hathaway Energy had agreed to purchase the company from SNC-Lavalin. The sale was completed December 1, 2014  following approval by the Alberta Utilities Commission.

Transmission in Alberta
Alberta's electricity market is separated into generation, transmission, and distribution.  While the cost of electricity generation is dependent upon market forces, the cost of electricity transmission and distribution in Alberta is regulated by the provincial government.

The planning and operation of Alberta's electric system is done by the Alberta Electric System Operator (AESO), a non-profit entity independent of any industry affiliations and owns no transmission or market assets.  The AESO determines the need for the province, and then directs Transmission Facilities Owners (TFOs) to build the project. 
Transmission Facilities Owners (TFOs) are regulated by the Alberta Utilities Commission (AUC) and include companies like AltaLink, ATCO Electric, ENMAX POWER in Calgary, and EPCOR in Edmonton.  All TFOs must follow AUC regulations in engaging stakeholders, and the projects have to be approved by the AUC.

Current projects

AltaLink is currently involved in a number of major projects, a couple considered publicly and politically sensitive.
 Heartland Transmission Project  - approved after intense debate and discussion with delegates of Edmonton and Sherwood Park.  This project will be connecting the "Heartland" industrial complex to the grid with a number of modern high capacity lines.
 Western Alberta Transmission Line Reinforcement
 Southern Alberta Transmission Line Reinforcement

Breaking down an electricity bill
AltaLink earns a regulated return on its investment to build, operate and maintain Alberta's power system, as determined by the AUC. AltaLink earns this return by recovering a portion of the transmission charge that is on every ratepayer's electricity bill. This transmission charge represents less than 10 per cent of the average total electricity bill.

Corporate governance
AltaLink is governed by a Board of Directors.  The current directors of the board include David Tuer (Chair), David R. Collyer, William J. Fehrman, Calvin D. Haack, Natalie Hocken, Susan Riddell Rose, Scott Thon, Brad Wall, Douglas Mitchell, Q.C., and Patricia Nelson.

Community Involvement
According to AltaLink's 2011 Report to Communities, through the building and maintenance of AltaLink's transmission facilities, the company expects to create more than 37,000 person-years of employment related to construction and local support services between 2010 and 2015.

AltaLink has been a sponsor of Alberta 4-H since 2005.  Currently, AltaLink is a Legacy Builder sponsor and is the title sponsor of all the regional, district, and provincial communications and public speaking programs.

AltaLink is also a member of the Joint Utility Safety Team (JUST). JUST's mandate is to positively affect change in attitudes and behaviours toward power line safety, to help reduce power-line incidents.

In partnership with the Avian Power Line Interaction Committee, AltaLink hosted Canada's first Avian Interactions with Power Lines Workshop that took place in Banff, Alberta from August 10 to 12, 2011. The international workshop brought together around 100 representatives from AltaLink and the Avian Power Line Interaction Committee, including government and industry professionals from across North America, to focus on protecting birds from electrical equipment.

AltaLink also hosts an annual Farm Safety Day in May in Calgary, an event focused on safety within the agricultural sector.

See also
 Electricity sector in Alberta
 Electricity policy of Alberta
 Electric power transmission
 Electricity market

References

AltaLink (2011). 2011 Report to Communities.  retrieved (2010-01-16)
AltaLink (2010). 2010 Report to Communities. retrieved (2010-01-16)
AltaLink (2014).  "Berkshire Hathaway Energy purchases SNC-Lavalin's equity in AltaLink "], retrieved (2014-01-03)

External links
 AltaLink Website
 Alberta Utilities Commission Website
 Alberta Electric System Operator Website
 Alberta Energy Website
 Alberta 4-H Website
 Joint Utility Safety Team Website
 Avian Power Line Interaction Committee Website

Electric power companies of Canada
Companies based in Calgary
2014 mergers and acquisitions
Canadian subsidiaries of foreign companies